The 2000 Sacramento mayoral election was held on March 7, 2000 and November 7, 2000 to elect the mayor of Sacramento, California. It saw the election of Heather Fargo.

Results

First round

Runoff results

References 

2000 California elections
Mayoral elections in Sacramento, California
Sacramento